Electroelution is a method used to extract a nucleic acid or a protein sample from an electrophoresis gel by applying a negative current in the plane of the smallest dimension of the gel, drawing the macromolecule to the surface for extraction and subsequent analysis. Electroblotting is based upon the same principle.

DNA extraction
Using this method, DNA fragments can be recovered from a particular region of agarose or polyacrylamide gels. The gel piece containing the fragment is excised (cut out from the whole gel) and placed in a dialysis bag with buffer. Electrophoresis causes the DNA to migrate out of the gel into the dialysis bag buffer. The DNA fragments are recovered from this buffer and purified, using phenol–chloroform extraction followed by ethanol precipitation. This method is simple, rapid and yields high (75%) recovery of DNA fragments from gel pieces.

References

Genetics experiments